Teijsmanniodendron is a genus of flowering plants in the mint family, Lamiaceae, first described in 1904. It is native to Southeast Asia and Papuasia.

Species
 Teijsmanniodendron ahernianum (Merr.) Bakh. - Borneo, Sumatra, Sulawesi, Philippines, Maluku, New Guinea, Solomon Islands 
 Teijsmanniodendron bintuluense Moldenke - Sarawak
 Teijsmanniodendron bogoriense Koord. - Thailand, Borneo, Sumatra, Sulawesi, Philippines, Maluku, New Guinea
 Teijsmanniodendron bullatum Rusea - Sarawak, Sabah
 Teijsmanniodendron coriaceum (C.B.Clarke) Kosterm - Thailand, Malaya, Borneo, Sumatra
 Teijsmanniodendron glabrum Merr. - Borneo, Sumatra
 Teijsmanniodendron havilandii (Ridl.) Rusea - Sarawak
 Teijsmanniodendron hollrungii (Warb.) Kosterm - Malaya, Borneo, Sulawesi, Maluku, New Guinea, Solomon Islands, Bismarck Archipelago
 Teijsmanniodendron holophyllum (Baker) Kosterm. - Vietnam, Borneo, Malaya, Sumatra, New Guinea, Tawi-Tawi Island in Philippines
 Teijsmanniodendron latiffii Rusea - Borneo
 Teijsmanniodendron obscurinerve Rusea - Sabah
 Teijsmanniodendron pteropodum (Miq.) Bakh. - Nicobar Islands, Indochina, Sumatra, Philippines
 Teijsmanniodendron punctatum Rusea - Sarawak
 Teijsmanniodendron renageorgeae Rusea - Sarawak, Brunei
 Teijsmanniodendron sarawakanum (H.Pearson) Kosterm. - Borneo
 Teijsmanniodendron scaberrimum Kosterm. ex Rusea - Borneo
 Teijsmanniodendron simplicifolium Merr - Borneo, Malaya, Sumatra
 Teijsmanniodendron simplicioides Kosterm. - Borneo, Malaya
 Teijsmanniodendron sinclairii Kosterm. - Terengganu, Borneo
 Teijsmanniodendron smilacifolium (H.Pearson) Kosterm. - Borneo
 Teijsmanniodendron subspicatum (Hallier f.) Kosterm. - Borneo, Sumatra
 Teijsmanniodendron unifoliolatum (Merr.) Moldenke - Borneo, Mindanao
 Teijsmanniodendron zainudinii Rusea - Sabah

References

Lamiaceae
Lamiaceae genera
Taxa named by Sijfert Hendrik Koorders